Sicilian Ghost Story is a 2017 Italian drama film directed by Fabio Grassadonia and Antonio Piazza. It is based on the real-life "The White Knight" short story in the We Won't Be Confused Forever volume by Marco Mancassola. and was screened in the International Critics' Week section at the 2017 Cannes Film Festival.

Plot
In a little Sicilian village at the edge of a forest, Giuseppe, a boy of 13, vanishes. Luna, his classmate who loves him, refuses to accept his mysterious disappearance. She rebels against the silence and complicity that surround her, and to find him she descends into the dark world which has swallowed him up and which has a lake as its mysterious entrance. Only their indestructible love will be able to bring her back alive.

Production
The film is inspired by true events and takes place in the 1990s in Sicily. It is dedicated to the memory of Giuseppe Di Matteo, abducted in 1996 and then brutally killed on orders of Sicilian Mafia boss Giovanni Brusca in order to silence his father, a cooperating witness.

Reception

Critical response
Sicilian Ghost Story opened the 56th International Critics' Week at Cannes Film Festival on 18 May 2017. It was the first time an Italian film opened the Critics' Week, and received a ten-minute standing ovation.

Varietys review was outstandingly positive, stating that  “with outstanding cinematography, underwater scenes and magical storytelling, the co-directors found a beautiful and strong way to tell such a tough story based on true events.”

The Hollywood Reporter described the film as a "Superb technical work transforms cruel reality into a fable with many ramifications," stating that "If Grassadonia and Piazza had simply retold the story, it would have been gripping enough, but they deepen the intensity and widen the meaning by letting the tale unfold in a strange filmic space between cruel reality and ghostly fantasy."

The film holds a 92% approval rating on review aggregation website Rotten Tomatoes, based on 36 reviews with an average rating of 7.1/10. The site's consensus reads: "Sicilian Ghost Story uses a horrific real-life story as the framework for a powerfully acted foray into surprisingly beguiling fantasy territory."

Sicilian Ghost Story won the David di Donatello for Best Adapted Script.

References

External links
 
 
 
 

2017 films
2017 drama films
Italian drama films
2010s Italian-language films
Films about the Sicilian Mafia
Films set in Sicily
Films set in the 1990s